Zerihun Tadele Derese (born 31 October 1989) is an Ethiopian international football goalkeeper who currently plays for Saint George FC in the Ethiopian Premier League.

International career

Zerihun made his Ethiopian national team début in a 2012 Africa Cup of Nations qualification game versus Nigeria on 27 March 2011 that saw Ethiopia lose 4–0. His second cap came in the friendly game against Tanzania on 11 January 2013.

References

External links
 Squad profile at Saintgeorgefc.com
 
 

1989 births
Living people
Association football goalkeepers
Ethiopian footballers
Ethiopia international footballers
2013 Africa Cup of Nations players
Sportspeople from Addis Ababa
Saint George S.C. players